Bambino is the Italian masculine form for "child". The feminine is bambina. The plural forms are bambinos in English and bambini in Italian. These words can refer to:

Sports
 Babe Ruth (1895–1948), Hall-of-Fame Major League Baseball player nicknamed "the Bambino"
 Héctor Veira (born 1946), Argentine retired footballer and manager
 The "Curse of the Bambino", a superstition regarding the Boston Red Sox baseball team
 Gianluca Lapadula, an Italian-Peruvian footballer

Arts and entertainment

Music

 "Bambino", first hit song by Dalida, which holds record for longest time spent on number 1 chart position, a total of 45 weeks.
 Héctor el Father or "Hector El Bambino", Puerto Rican former reggaeton recording artist and producer Héctor Delgado Román (born 1978)
 Tito El Bambino (born 1981), Puerto Rican singer
 "Bambina" (Idoli song)
 "Bambino (Napoli Lullaby)", a song recorded by The Springfields
 "Bambina", a song in Nue (Lara Fabian album)
 Nickname given to the singing and rapping duo Bars and Melody's fans

Other
 Bambino, Bud Spencer's character in the film They Call Me Trinity and in the sequel Trinity Is Still My Name
 Bambino, a male character in The Bridge, a 1969 Yugoslav war film
 Bambino!, a Japanese manga
 "Bambina," the nickname given in the anime La storia della Arcana Famiglia to Felicita
 "Orient Bambino", a line of automatic wrist watches by Japanese manufacturer "Orient Watch"

Wine grapes
 Bambino (grape), another name for the Italian wine grape Bombino bianco
Bombino nero, another wine grape that is also known as Bambino
Cesanese Comune, another wine grape that is also known as Bambino

Other uses
 Il Bambino, the name given in art to the image of the infant Jesus
 Bambino (cat), a cross breed cat
 Fiat 500, known in Australia as "Bambino"
Bambino (ice-cream), Polish

See also 

 Bimbo, from the Italian for a (male) baby or young child